The Shrine of Fatima Masumeh ( translit. haram-e fateme-ye masumeh) is located in Qom, which is considered by Twelver Shia Muslims to be the second most sacred city in Iran after Mashhad.

Fatima Masumeh was the sister of the eighth Twelver Shi'ite Imam Reza, and the daughter of the seventh Imam Musa al-Kadhim (Tabari 60). In Shia Islam, women are often revered as saints if they are close relatives to one of the Twelver Imams. Fatima Masumeh is therefore honored as a saint, and her shrine in Qom is considered one of the most significant Shi'i shrines in Iran. Every year, thousands of Shi'i Muslims travel to Qom to honor Fatima Masumeh and ask her for blessings. Also buried within the shrine are three daughters of the ninth Twelver Imām Muhammad al-Taqī.

Specifications
The three prayer halls are named: Tabātabā'ī, Bālā Sar, and A‘dham.

Ziyarah 

Though Shi'i theology formally states that the relatives of the Imams, or Imamzadehs, hold a lower status than the Imams, popular Shi'ism still strongly venerates imamzadehs. In Iran, there are many more burial places of the Imams' relatives than there are for the Imams themselves. Imamzadehs are considered to be close to God and religiously pious because of their close relation to Imams. Shi'is commonly travel on pilgrimages to shrines of imamzadehs, such as the Shrine of Fatima Masumeh, the sister of the 8th Imam 'Ali al-Rida, in Qom, Iran. Men and women seek cures to ailments, solutions to problems, and forgiveness of sins at these sites. Many hadiths, or teachings, are recorded from Shi'i Imams praising the veneration of Fatima Masumeh, and proclaiming that those who make a pilgrimage to her Shrine will "certainly be admitted to heaven."

Fatima Masumeh's Shrine in Qom is crowded every day of the year with Shi'i men, women, and children from all around the world. Some stay for hours or days praying at the mosque and circumambulating her tomb. The economy of Qom has become reliant on this pilgrimage for the tourism it brings. In turn, Qom has remained conservative and traditional to maintain a pious environment for pilgrims. Many miracles have been recorded as taking place at this shrine, and they are documented in a special office within the shrine complex. Some are published in the shrines monthly newspaper, the Payam-e Astan.

Pilgrims at the Shrine of Fatima Masumeh follow rituals that have been passed down for centuries. Imam Ali al-Rida, Fatimah's brother, outlined these ritual acts as he described the way he visited her Shrine. The prayer Imam al-Rida dictated to his sister continues to be part of the pilgrimage. Since the Safavid period, additional rituals have been added that are now typical for many Shi'i pilgrimages including ritual washing beforehand, dressing in perfumed clothing, and entering the site with one's right foot.

History

Early 
Since the beginning of Qom's history in the 7th century, the city has been associated with Shi'ism and set apart from the Sunni caliphate. Many Shi'i hadiths referred to Qom as a "place of refuge for believers," calling it a deeply religious place. After Fatima Masumeh's death in Qom and the construction of her Shrine, scholars began to gather in Qom and the city gained its reputation for religious learning. Today, Qom is still noted for its religious seminaries and organizations.

Fatima Masumeh died in Qom in 201 A.H. as she travelled to join her brother, Imam Ali al-Rida in Khorasan. The caravan she travelled in was attacked in Saveh by the Abbasid Sunnis, and 23 of Fatima Masumeh's family and friends were killed (Jaffer). Fatima Masumeh was then poisoned by a woman from the Sunni enemies, fell ill, and asked to be taken to Qom, where she died. Fatima Masumeh's host in Qom buried her in his plot of land.

The style of Fatima Masumeh's Shrine has developed over many centuries. At first, her tomb was covered with a bamboo canopy. Fifty years later, this was replaced by a more durable domed building, at the request of the daughter of Imam Muhammad at-Taqī, Sayyida Zaynab. The family of Sayyida Zainab later added a further two domes to the Shrine. These architectural projects marked the beginning of female patronage of the tomb of Fatima Masumeh.

Safavid period 
 In 1519, Tajlu Khanum, the wife of Shah Isma'il I, led a project to improve the drainage around the Shrine, embellish the Shrine with an iwan and two minarets, and reconstruct the tomb chamber as a domed octagon. During the Safavid dynasty, the women of this family were very active in embellishing the Shrine of Fatima Masumeh. In times of war, Safavid royal women found refuge in Qom, and likely compared their situation to that of Fatima Masumeh. These women donated beautiful fabrics and other items to the Shrine. Shah Abbas I of the Safavids did not patronize the Shrine of Fatima Masumeh as much as he did other shrines of Imams, but he did offer books to the Shrine's seminary library. Over the years, many Safavids of royal birth were buried close to the Shrine of Fatima Masumeh.

Modern 

From 1795–1796, Fath-Ali Shah Qajar converted two Safavid sahn or courtyards into one large courtyard and, in 1803, fixed the golden dome. In 1883, Amin al-Sultan added the new sahn e-jadid or "New Court" to the Shrine complex.

During Ayatollah Khomeini's 1979 Iranian Revolution, Qom was named "the birthplace" of this movement. Khomeini studied in Qom and lived there at the beginning and end of the Revolution. Aspects of the culture of Qom, including the Shrine of Fatima Masumeh, were used to unite the Iranian people over significant historical and mythical events. Khomeini used images of the Shrine of Fatima Masumeh in posters, money, and stamps created during the Revolution. Khomeini also constructed an addition to the Shrine of Fatima Masumeh and added more space for pilgrims. In addition, the tomb of Ayatollah Khomeini utilizes architectural elements that are similar to Fatima Masumeh's Shrine, such as the golden dome. See Mausoleum of Khomeini.

Notable burials 
 Fatemeh Masumeh (790–816) – daughter of Musa al-Kadhim

Royalty
 Kheyr al-Nesa Begum (1548–1579) – Safavid princess
 Shah Safi (1611–1642) – Shahanshah of Persia (1629–42)
 Shah Abbas II (1632–1666) – Shahanshah of Persia (1642–66)
 Shah Suleiman I (1647–1694) – Shahanshah of Persia (1666–94)
 Shah Sultan Hossein (1668–1726) – Shahanshah of Persia (1694–1722)
 Shah Abbas III (d. 1739) – Shahanshah of Persia (1732–36)
 Qahraman Mirza (fa) (d. 1840) – Qajar prince
 Fath-Ali Shah (1772–1834) – Shahanshah of Persia (1797–1834)
 Mohammad Shah (1808–1848) – Shahanshah of Persia (1834–48)
 Galin Khanom (fa) (d. 1857) – Qajar princess
 Malek Jahan Khanom Mahd-e Olia (1805–1873) – mother of Nasser al-Din Shah Qajar
 Fakhr od-Dowleh (it) (1861–1893) – Qajar princess
 Afsar od-Dowleh (fa) (1859–1901) – Qajar princess
 Ali-Naghi Mirza (fa) (1860–1917) – Qajar prince
 Malek-Mansour Mirza (1880–1922) – Qajar prince
 Abdolsamad Mirza (fa) (1845–1929) – Qajar prince
 Kamran Mirza (1856–1929) – Qajar prince and governor of Tehran

Political figures
 Hassan Khan Mostowfi ol-Mamalek Ashtiani (fa) (1781–1845) – politician
 Manouchehr Khan Gorji Mo'tamed od-Dowleh (d. 1847) – politician
 Ali Khan Hajeb od-Dowleh (fa) (d. 1867) – politician
 Anoushirvan Khan Etezad od-Dowleh (d. 1868) – politician
 Farrokh Khan Amin od-Dowleh (1812–1871) – Persian ambassador to France and Great Britain
 Asadollah Nazem od-Dowleh (fa) (d. 1900) – politician
 Ali-Asghar Khan Amin os-Sultan (1843–1907) – prime minister (1887–96) and (1907)
 Mohammad-Baqer Khan Saad os-Saltaneh (d. 1907) – politician
 Ebrahim Motamed os-Saltaneh (fa) (d. 1917) – politician
 Ahmad Khan Moshir os-Saltaneh (1844–1919) – prime minister (1907–08)
 Mohammad Eqbal od-Dowleh (fa) (1848–1924) – politician
 Yahya Diba Nazem od-Dowleh (fa) (1886–1940) – politician
 Hassan Vosough Vosough od-Dowleh (1873–1950) – prime minister (1909–10, 1911 and 1916–17)
 Abdollah Vosough Motamed os-Saltaneh (fa) (1884–1952) – politician
 Ahmad Qavam Qavam os-Saltaneh (1876–1955) – prime minister (1921, 1922–23, 1942–43, 1946–47 and 1952)
 Faramarz Asadi (1869–1969) – politician
 Hossein Dadgar Adl ol-Molk (1881–1971) – speaker of the Majles (1928–35)
 Mohammad-Vali Gharani (1913–1979) – army general
 Mehdi Eraqi (1930–1979) – a founder of Fadayan-e Islam
 Mehdi Bazargan (1907–1995) – prime minister (1979)

Scholars
 Aghabeyim Javanshir (1780–1832) – poet
 Yusef Etesami Ashtiani (1874–1938) – writer and translator
 Parvin Etesami (1907–1941) – poet
 Mohammad Meshkat (fa) (1900–1980) – scholar
 Ali Davani (1929–2007) – author

Clerics
 Qotbeddin Ravandi (fa) (d. 1177) – medieval cleric
 Fazlollah Nouri (1843–1909) – cleric
 Abdolkarim Haeri Yazdi (1859–1937) – cleric
 Mehdi Ashtiani (1888–1952) – cleric
 Mohammad-Taghi Khansari (fa) (1888–1952) – cleric
 Sadreddin Sadr (1882–1954) – cleric
 Hossein Borujerdi (1875–1961) – cleric
 Soltan ol-Vaezin Shirazi (1894–1971) – cleric
 Morteza Motahhari (1920–1979) – cleric
 Mohammad Mofatteh (1928–1979) – cleric
 Mohammad-Hossein Tabatabaei (1904–1981) – cleric
 Asadollah Madani (1914–1981) – cleric
 Ali Qoddusi (1927–1981) – cleric
 Mohammad Montazeri (1944–1981) – cleric
 Khalil Kamarei (1898–1984) – cleric
 Reza Zanjani (1902–1984) – cleric
 Ahmad Khonsari (1887–1985) – cleric
 Morteza Haeri Yazdi (1916–1986) – cleric
 Shahabeddin Marashi Najafi (1897–1990) – cleric
 Mohammad-Reza Golpaygani (1898–1993) – cleric
 Hashem Amoli (1899–1993) – cleric
 Mohammad-Ali Araki (1894–1994) – cleric
 Mohammad-Jafar Moravej (1902–1999) – cleric
 Ahmad Azari Qomi (1925–1999) – cleric
 Mohammad Shirazi (1928–2001) – cleric
 Esmail Mousavi Zanjani (1928–2002) – cleric
 Sadegh Khalkhali (1926–2003) – cleric ("Eichmann of Iran")
 Mohammad Vaez Abaee Khorasani (1940–2004) – cleric
 Javad Tabrizi (1926-2006) – cleric
 Ali Meshkini (1921–2007) – cleric and chairman of Assembly of Experts (1983–2007) 
 Mohammad Fazel Lankarani (1931-2007) – cleric
 Ahmad Mojtahedi Tehrani (1923-2008) – cleric
 Mohammad-Taqi Behjat Fumani (1913–2009) – cleric
 Hossein-Ali Montazeri (1922–2009) – cleric
 Mohammad Mofti al-Shia Mousavi (1928–2010) – cleric
 Abbas Hosseini Kashani (1931–2010) – cleric
 Mohammad-Hassan Ahmadi Faqih (1951–2010) – cleric
 Yousef Madani Tabrizi (1928–2013) – cleric
 Moslem Malakouti (1924–2014) – cleric
 Abdol-Karim Mousavi Ardabili (1926–2016) – cleric and chief justice (1981–89)
 Ahmad Ahmadi (1933–2018) – cleric
 Mahmoud Hashemi Shahroudi (1948–2018) – cleric and chief justice (1999–2009)
 Nasrallah Shah-Abadi (1930-2018) – cleric
 Mohammad Hossaini Shahroudi (1925–2019) – cleric
 Qorban-Ali Mohaqeq Kaboli (1927–2019) – cleric
 Mohammad Momen (1938–2019) – cleric
 Ebrahim Amini (1925–2020) – cleric
 Mohammad Yazdi (1931–2020) - cleric and chief justice (1989–1999)
 Mohammad-Taqi Mesbah-Yazdi (1935–2021) - cleric

See also
 Holiest sites in Islam (Shia)
 Imām Ridhā Mosque
 Shāh Abdol Azīm Mosque
 Iranian architecture
 Islamic architecture
 Seyyed Mohammad Saeedi, the shrine trustee

References

External links

 Biography of Fatimah Ma'sumah and history of the Al-Masumeh Shrine

Buildings and structures completed in the 17th century
Cemeteries in Iran
Buildings and structures in Qom
Safavid architecture
Shia cemeteries
Shia shrines
Shrines in Iran
Tourist attractions in Qom Province